Bon Dialgam (also spelled as Bonadialgam) is a village in the Anantnag tehsil of Anantnag district in the Kashmir Valley of the Indian union territory of Jammu and Kashmir.

About Bona Dialgam 
According to Census 2011 information the location code or village code of Bona Dialgam village is 003729. Bona Dialgam village is located in Anantnag Tehsil of Anantnag district in Jammu & Kashmir, India. Anantnag is nearest town to Bona Dialgam village.

References

Villages in Anantnag district